Sankar Monastery, or Sankar Gompa is a Buddhist monastery within an easy half-hour walk from Leh in Ladakh, northern India. It is a daughter-establishment of Spituk Monastery and the residence of the Abbot of Spituk, the Venerable Kushok Bakula, who is the senior incarnate lama of Ladakh due to his ancient lineage and personal authority.

Description
It is a relatively modern, attractive cluster of buildings set amongst trees above the town, in the lee of Khardung La, a 5,359 m (17,582 ft) pass behind Leh leading to the Shyok and Nubra Valleys.

Only 20 monks at most live here, and only a few permanently, so visiting hours are limited to early morning and evening. The place is well lit, so an evening visit is worthwhile. Climbing the steps one reaches the double doors leading into the dukang (du khang) or assembly hall. Three green drums are on the right of the door under which is the place of the Gyeskos. The wall and entry door are richly painted. Upstairs is the Dukar Lhakang ("residence of the deity") or inner sanctuary. There is an impressive figure here of Avalokiteśvara (Tibetan: Chenrezig) with 1,000 arms (all holding weapons) and 1,000 heads. The walls are painted with a Tibetan calendar, mandalas and rules for the monks. Above the wooden stairs can be seen the rooms of the Abbot, guest rooms and the library.

A lama from Sankar Monastery visits the mid-sixteenth century fort built by Tashi Namgyal at Namgyal Tsemo, the peak above Leh every morning and evening to maintain the temples associated with the fort and light the butter-lamps.

Footnotes

References

 Rizvi, Janet. 1996. Ladakh: Crossroads of High Asia. Second Edition. Oxford India Paperbacks. 3rd Impression 2001. .
 Schettler, Margret & Rolf. Kashmir, Ladakh & Zanskar. Lonely Planet. South Yarra, Victoria, Australia.

Buddhist monasteries in Ladakh
Gelug monasteries and temples